Ballyhaunis GAA is a Gaelic Athletic Association club located in the town of Ballyhaunis in eastern County Mayo, Ireland. The club fields both football and hurling teams and is a member of the East division of Mayo GAA.

Achievements
 Mayo Senior Hurling Championship winners 2002, 2004, 2005, 2006, 2008, 2009, 2010, 2011, 2012, 2014, 2015, 2016, 2020
 Connacht Senior Club Hurling Championship: runners-up 2004
 Connacht Intermediate Club Hurling Championship: runners-up 2009, 2010, 2014, 2016

Notable players
 J. J. Cribbin
 Keith Higgins

References

Gaelic games clubs in County Mayo
Hurling clubs in County Mayo